Serialization, in computer science, is the process of saving an object so that it can be re-created.

Serialization is also another, perhaps more correct name for thread or process synchronization.

Serialization or serialisation may also refer to:

 Serial (literature), told in contiguous installments in sequential issues of a single periodical publication
 Serializability, in databases and transaction processing
 Seriality, a term used in political science, gender studies, and existentialism
 Serial verb construction, a feature of the grammar of some languages

See also
Serial (disambiguation)